Qaheh (also Romanized as Qoheh; also known as Kūheh) is a  District]], in the Central District of Dehaqan County, Isfahan Province, Iran. At the 2006 census, its population was 1,011, in 316 families.

References 

Populated places in Dehaqan County